Emre Mor (born 24 July 1997) is a Turkish professional footballer who plays as a forward for Turkish Süper Lig club Fenerbahçe.

Early life 
Emre Mor was born and raised in Brønshøj, Copenhagen, Denmark, to a Turkish mother from North Macedonia and a Turkish father. He holds Danish and Turkish citizenship.

Club career

Early career
At the age of 16 in December 2013, Mor was on a trial training with Saint-Étienne but did not receive a contract.

Mor played at Lyngby on U17 and U19 levels before he was released by the club in January 2015. The message from the club was that "the conclusion is that the talent can not be redeemed in Lyngby Boldklub". In 2016, it was reported that he was released due to attitude problems.

FC Nordsjælland
On 31 January 2015, it was confirmed, that Mor had signed a contract with FC Nordsjælland, despite being courted by other clubs in the Superliga and abroad. The original intent was for Mor to play for the U19.

Mor got his official debut for FCN on 28 November 2015. Mor started on the bench, but replaced Guðmundur Þórarinsson in the 84th minute in a 0–1 defeat against Randers FC in the Danish Superliga. In the next league match after his debut, Mor was in the starting lineup against Brøndby IF. Mor's performance earned him a new contract and a promotion to the first team squad from January 2016.

Borussia Dortmund
Borussia Dortmund confirmed signing Mor on 7 June 2016, announcing a five-year contract.

In a training session after a defeat against Bayern Munich in April 2017, Mor and his teammates were sent on a run by manager Thomas Tuchel and physical trainer Rainer Schrey. When Tuchel and Schrey instructed Mor to continue on for an extra round, Mor reportedly loudly protested, which prompted a fiery reaction from Tuchel. Earlier on the year, it was also reported that Dortmund were dissatisfied with Mor's attitude and willingness to integrate into the team.

He made only 12 appearances in the Bundesliga and UEFA Champions League for Borussia Dortmund during the 2016-17 season, usually as a substitute on the right wing or in attacking midfield.

Celta Vigo
On 29 August 2017, Mor signed for Spanish club Celta Vigo for €13 million. That made him the second most expensive signing in Celta’s history.

He started just only one Liga game for the club and played only 384 minutes until mid December. On 17 December 2017, he was on the bench again for the loss against Villarreal while youth team player Brais Méndez filled in for the suspended Iago Aspas.

In April 2018, Mor was late for training before a home game against Sevilla after he had been excluded from the squad in two games. Unzué once again claimed, that Mor had to change his attitude before he again would be a part of the team. Mor then went out and apologized on Twitter, writing:

Good luck to my teammates against Sevilla. Disappointed I can't help them on the pitch today but I can only blame myself. As a professional I shouldn't have been late for training. This won't ever happen again and I will try everything to get back into the squad!

Afterwards, Mor was sent to train on his own for a period. Less than one month later, in May 2018, Mor was sent home early from training for the second time in a month. Mor wasn't a part of the playing team for the remainder of the season.

The 2018/19 season started as the last season ended. In the first eight league games, Mor only played 38 minutes, despite Miguel Cardoso being appointed as the club's new manager. In January 2019, Mor was once again excluded from training because of his attitude and for acts of indiscipline. He was left out from the squad in the following eight league games and was excluded from the training in over one month. Celta gave the player one more chance at the end of February 2019, where he returned to first team training.

Galatasaray (loan)
On 31 July 2019, Galatasaray announced via social media that Mor had joined the club on a season-long loan.

Olympiacos (loan)
On 31 January 2020, Olympiacos confirmed the signing of  Mor, on loan from Celta Vigo for the remainder of the 2019–20 season. Olympiacos would pay Celta Vigo a loan fee of €410,000 and Galatasaray would cover €290,000 from the contract. Celta Vigo had announced that the deal provided for a compulsory purchase by Olympiacos at the end of the 2019–20 season if specific player goals were met, as agreed between the two clubs, indicated that the compulsory purchase option was set at €4,000,000 and this amount would be paid by the Greek side Mor plays at least half of Olympiacos' matches before the end of the season, with a future resale rate for the Spanish club between 10% to 20%.

Fatih Karagümrük (loan)
On 26 August 2021, Mor returned to Turkey to join Süper Lig side Fatih Karagümrük on a season-long loan deal. On 18 March 2022, Mor scored his first hat-trick against Kayserispor.

International career

He represented Denmark in their U17, U18, and U19 teams. However, in 2016 he switched allegiances to the Turkish Football Federation, with his father having to sign Mor's citizenship papers from a prison cell while serving a sentence for a driving offense. Mor was called up to the Turkey U21 team, in a 2017 UEFA European Under-21 Championship qualification match against the Slovakia U21.

Mor made his senior debut for Turkey against Montenegro in Antalya in May 2016. He was included in the Turkey senior team's squad for UEFA Euro 2016, making him the third-youngest player at the tournament. He came off the bench to replace Cenk Tosun in Turkey's opening Euro 2016 game against Croatia. He was also part of the starting 11 in the last match Turkey played in the 2016 European Championship against the Czech Republic and made an assist to Burak Yılmaz for the opening goal.

Personal life
His mother Güzele Bekirov is Turkish-Macedonian and his father Ersoy Mor is Turkish from Uşak, Turkey.

He does not speak Turkish.

Career statistics

Club

International

Scores and results table list Turkey's goal tally first.

Honours
Borussia Dortmund
 DFB-Pokal: 2016–17

Galatasaray
 Turkish Super Cup: 2019

Olympiacos
 Super League Greece: 2019–20
 Greek Cup: 2019–20

References

External links

 
 
 
 Emre Mor on DBU

1997 births
Living people
Footballers from Copenhagen
Turkish footballers
Turkey international footballers
Turkey under-21 international footballers
Danish people of Turkish descent
Danish people of Macedonian descent
Danish men's footballers
Denmark youth international footballers
Danish Superliga players
Bundesliga players
La Liga players
Süper Lig players
FC Nordsjælland players
Borussia Dortmund players
RC Celta de Vigo players
Galatasaray S.K. footballers
Olympiacos F.C. players
UEFA Euro 2016 players
Association football wingers
Turkish expatriate footballers
Expatriate footballers in Germany
Expatriate footballers in Spain
Expatriate footballers in Greece
Danish expatriate sportspeople in Germany
Turkish expatriate sportspeople in Germany
Turkish people of Macedonian descent
Citizens of Turkey through descent